Brandes is a German surname and Jewish surname, and may refer to:

 Bernd Jürgen Armando Brandes (1961-2001), German cannibalism victim
 Bruno Brandes (1910–1985), German lawyer and politician (CDU), MdB, MdL Niedersachsen
 Charles Brandes, American money manager
 Christian Brandes (born 1971), German politician (Partei Rechtsstaatlicher Offensive)
 David Brandes (born 1968), German musician
 Detlef Brandes (born 1941), German historian and professor at Heinrich Heine University of Düsseldorf
 Dietmar Brandes (born 1948), German botanist, professor and librarian
 Eddo Brandes, cricketer from Zimbabwe
 Edvard Brandes (1847–1931), Danish Cultural politician and editor and co-founder of the newspaper Politiken, brother of Georg Brandes
 Ernst Brandes (1758–1810), German lawyer
 Ernst Immanuel Cohen Brandes (1844-1892), Danish economist and newspaper editor
 Esther Charlotte Brandes (1742–1786), actress
 Georg Brandes (1842–1927), Danish writer and literature critic, brother of Edvard Brandes
 Gustav Brandes (1842–1941), German zoologist
 Heinrich Brandes (1803–1868), German landscape painter
 Heinrich Wilhelm Brandes (1777–1834), German astronomer, mathematician and physicist
 Jan Laurens Andries Brandes (1857-1905), Dutch historian
 Johann Christian Brandes (1735–1799), German dramatist
 John Brandes (born 1964), American football player
 Lothar Brandes (born 1926), German painter
 Rudolph Simon Brandes (1795–1842), German naturalist and pharmacist
 Werner Brandes (1889–1968), German cameraman
 Wilhelm Brandes (1854–1928), German writer
 Will Brandes (1928–1990), German pop singer
 Winfried Brandes (born 1942), managing director of 'Prussian Memorial Institute e.V.'

See also
 Brand
 Brandeis
 Brandis (surname)